Paddy Smyth (born 1998) is an Irish hurler who plays for Dublin Championship club Clontarf and at inter-county level with the Dublin senior hurling team. He usually lines out as a corner-back.

Career

A member of the Clontarf club, Smyth first came to prominence on the inter-county scene as captain of the Dublin minor team that won the 2016 Leinster Championship. He subsequently lined out with the Dublin under-21 team as well as with DCU Dóchas Éireann in the Fitzgibbon Cup. Smyth was just out of the minor grade when he was added to the Dublin senior hurling team, making his debut during the 2017 league.

Career statistics

Honours

Dublin 
Leinster Minor Hurling Championship: 2016

References

External link
Paddy Smyth profile at the Dublin GAA website

1998 births
Living people
Clontarf Gaelic footballers
Dublin inter-county hurlers